"Dance of the Clairvoyants" is a song by American rock band Pearl Jam. The song was released on January 22, 2020, as the lead single from their eleventh studio album, Gigaton (2020). An accompanying music video was released on the same day. The lyrics were written by Eddie Vedder and the music was written by all five members of the band.

Background
The band's bassist, Jeff Ament, said of the song:

Release and reception
A fifteen-second sample from "Dance of the Clairvoyants" was published on Pearl Jam's social media on January 21, 2020. The full song was released  via streaming and download at 12:00 a.m. Eastern Time on January 22, 2020.

"Dance of the Clairvoyants" has been noted as being an evolution of the band's sound, as there is more of an electronic influence in the song than previous Pearl Jam songs.

Music video
A music video titled "Dance of the Clairvoyants (Mach I)" was released on the band's official YouTube channel on January 22, 2020. It was directed by Joel Edwards, produced by Evolve Studios with footage by Filmsupply. A second music video featuring the band titled "Dance of the Clairvoyants (Mach II)" was directed by Ryan Cory and was released on January 29, 2020.

On February 7, 2020, Pearl Jam released a third video titled  "Dance of the Clairvoyants (Mach III)". This video was billed by the band as their first official video in seven years.

Personnel
Adapted from Pearl Jam's official YouTube channel.
Jeff Ament – guitar, keyboards
Matt Cameron – drums, percussion, drum programming
Stone Gossard – guitar, bass guitar
Mike McCready – guitar, percussion
Eddie Vedder – lead vocals, backing vocals

Charts

Weekly charts

Year-end charts

References

External links
Announcement of single release

"Dance of the Clairvoyants (Mach III)" (Official music video) on YouTube

2020 singles
2020 songs
Pearl Jam songs
American new wave songs
Songs written by Eddie Vedder
Songs written by Jeff Ament
Songs written by Matt Cameron
Songs written by Mike McCready
Songs written by Stone Gossard
Monkeywrench Records singles